Abdolkazem (also Romanized as ʿAbdolḵāẓem) is a village in Karkheh Rural District, Hamidiyeh District, Ahvaz County, Khuzestan Province, Iran. At the 2006 census, its population was 48, in 9 families.

References 

Populated places in Ahvaz County